Carlos Santiago Davio (born February 3, 1985 in Capilla del Señor) is an Argentinian football striker.

References

External links 
 Santiago Davio at playmakerstats.com (English version of ceroacero.es)

Living people
1985 births
Argentine footballers
Argentine expatriate footballers
Association football forwards
Expatriate footballers in El Salvador
Defensores Unidos footballers
Sportspeople from Buenos Aires Province